Château Beaugey is a château in Gironde, Nouvelle-Aquitaine, France.

Châteaux in Gironde